The governor of Aruba is the representative on Aruba of the Dutch monarch. The governor's duties are twofold; he represents and guards the general interests of the Kingdom of the Netherlands and is head of the Aruban government. He is accountable to the government of the kingdom. As the head of the Aruban government, the governor is inviolable; the ministers are responsible. The governor does not have political responsibilities and is not part of the Aruban cabinet. During the formation of a cabinet, the governor plays an important role. The governor is appointed by the monarch for a period of six years. This period can be prolonged for one more term of six years. The governor is supported and advised by the Council of Advice, consisting of at least five members, appointed by the governor, advising him on the drafts of state ordinances, state decrees, kingdom acts and general administrative orders.

List of governors 

On 1 January 1986 Aruba attained its status aparte. Before this date the governor of the Netherlands Antilles was represented on Aruba by a lieutenant-governor.

References

External links 
  

Government of Aruba